La zona is a Spanish dystopian drama limited series created by Alberto and Jorge Sánchez-Cabezudo for Movistar+. The series contains 8 episodes, and premiered on 27 October 2017 on #0 and Movistar+'s VOD service.

Premise
Police inspector Héctor Uría returns to work three years after a nuclear disaster in Green Spain; Uría was the sole survivor of the first rescue team that reached the reactor. Now, he must conduct the investigation of the brutal murder of a man in the exclusion zone.

Cast

Main cast
 Eduard Fernández as Inspector Héctor Uría
 Emma Suárez as Marta Carcedo
 Alexandra Jiménez as Julia Martos
 Alba Galocha as Zoe Montero
 Álvaro Cervantes as Martín Garrido
 Marina Salas as Esther Uría Carcedo

Recurring cast
 Tamar Novas as Ricardo
 Inma Cuevas as Fabiana Garmendia
 Salva Reina as Gabriel Sánchez Soler "El Caníbal"
 Sergio Peris-Mencheta as Aurelio Barrero
 Manolo Solo as Alfredo Asunción
 Luis Zahera as Lucio Braña Izquierdo
 Daniel Pérez Prada as Pablo Gómez Asensio "Pelirrojo"
 Carlos Bardem as Mateo Jiménez Corral "Krusty"
 Juan Echanove as Fausto Armendáriz
 Josean Bengoetxea as Luis Carreño
 Carlos Rodríguez as Dani
 Pau Durá as Delegado Ferreras
 Daniel Jumillas as Pipo
 Emilio Palacios as Bruno
 Germán Alkarazu as Federico Uría
 María Cantuel as Sara
 Fernando Sánchez-Cabezudo as Enrique 
 Inma Nieto as Juez Noriega 
 Félix Arkarazo as  Ramón 
 Oleg Kricunova as Román 
 Sonsoles Benedicto as Amalia
 Juan Codina as Manuel Montero 
 Ana Gracia as Abogada de Zoe 
 Pilar Gómez as Rosa Hernández 
 Francisco Olmos as Comisario Vázquez
 Maite Brik as Luisa

Episodes

International broadcast
The series was picked up by Starz for the United States. In France, it was picked up by Canal+, and by ZDF in Germany. In Latin America, it is available through Movistar Series and Movistar Play.

Awards and nominations

References

External links
 
 

2010s crime drama television series
2017 Spanish television series debuts
2017 Spanish television series endings
Crime thriller television series
Dystopian television series
Spanish crime television series
2010s Spanish drama television series
Spanish science fiction television series
Spanish-language television shows
Television shows set in Spain
Movistar+ network series